Patrick Cobbe (born 1940) is an Irish retired hurler who played as right corner-forward for the Limerick senior team.

Born in Limerick, Cobbe first played competitive hurling during his schooling at CBS Sexton Street. He arrived on the inter-county scene at the age of seventeen when he first linked up with the Limerick minor team. He joined the senior panel during the 1963 championship. Cobbe was a regular member of the team over the next few years, however, he ended his career without any major success.

At club level Cobbe played with St Patrick's.

Cobbe's retirement came following the conclusion of the 1964 championship.

Honours

Team

Limerick
All-Ireland Minor Hurling Championship (1): 1958 (c)
Munster Minor Hurling Championship (1): 1958 (c)

References

1940 births
Living people
Limerick inter-county hurlers
St Patrick's (Limerick) hurlers